Philonthus is a genus of large rove beetles in the family Staphylinidae. There are more than 380 described species in Philonthus.

See also
 List of Philonthus species

References

Further reading

External links

 

Staphylininae
Articles created by Qbugbot